Vaivara may refer to:
Vaivara, Estonia, a village in Estonia
Vaivara Parish
Vaivara concentration camp, located in the village